Conca is a commune in the Corse-du-Sud department of France on the island of Corsica. It is the southern terminus of the GR 20 walking route.

Geography

Climate
Conca has a mediterranean climate (Köppen climate classification Csa).

Population

See also
Communes of the Corse-du-Sud department
Aiguilles de Bavella

References

Communes of Corse-du-Sud